London B.C. Medelynas are a British-Lithuanian basketball club, based in London, England.

History
The club was founded in 2012, initially entering the British Lithuanian Basketball League. Achieving early success in the competition, Medelynas joined the English Basketball League the following season, winning the Division 4 South East title and finishing as runners-up in the national Division 4 Playoffs.

Medelynas re-entered the NBL in 2017, achieving back-to-back promotions into the newly organised Division 2 South.

In 2019, the club merged with the Baltic Stars basketball club, an extensive junior basketball program founded in 2011.  The junior teams retained the Baltic Stars name.

Teams
For the 2019–20 season, Medelynas / Baltic Stars will field the following national league teams: 

Senior Men: National League Division 2 South
U16 Boys: National League U16 Premier South
U14 Boys: National League U14 Premier South East

U14 Boys II: National League U14 Conference South
U14 Boys III: National League U14 Conference South

Honours
Men's National League Division 3 Playoffs Champions: 2018-19  
Men's National League Division 3 South League Champions: 2018-19
Men's National League Division 4 South East League Champions: 2017-18
Men's National League Division 4 South East League Champions: 2013-14
British Lithuanian Basketball League Division A Champions: 2012-13

Home Venue
Medelynas play their home games at Newham Sixth Form College in the east end of London.

Season-by-season records

References

Basketball teams in England
Sport in London
Basketball teams established in 2000
2000 establishments in England
Lithuanian diaspora in Europe